Bob Atchison  is a Canadian drag racer. He was inducted into the Canadian Motorsport Hall of Fame in 2006.

See also
Motorsport in Canada

References

Living people
Racing drivers from Ontario
Dragster drivers
Year of birth missing (living people)
Place of birth missing (living people)